The Malargüe Group is a group of geologic formations of the Neuquén Basin of the Mendoza, Neuquén, Río Negro and La Pampa Provinces in northern Patagonia, Argentina. The formations of the Malargüe Group range in age between the middle Campanian to Deseadan, an Oligocene age of the SALMA classification, straddling the Cretaceous–Paleogene boundary, about 79 million to 30 million years in age. The group overlies the older Neuquén Group, separated by an unconformity dated to 79 Ma. The rocks of the Malargüe Group comprise both marine and continental deposits which are over 400 m (1312 ft) thick in total.

Subdivision 
The Malargüe Group is subdivided into:
 Agua de la Piedra Formation (Deseadan) - white-grayish tuffs and tobaceous paleosols
 Roca Formation (Maastrichtian to Danian) - coastal mudstones and sandstones
 Jagüel Formation (middle Maastrichtian to Danian) - shallow marine mudstones
 Loncoche Formation (late Campanian to early Maastrichtian) - terrestrial conglomerates and sandstones, delta plain sandstones and limestones
 Allen Formation (middle Campanian to early Maastrichtian) - eolian sandstones and fluvio-lacustrine mudstones and limestones

Fossil content 

Fossils of dinosaurs, plesiosaurs, turtles (Euclastes, Mendozachelys wichmanni), Paleoanculosa sp., fish, birds (cf. Andrewsornis sp.) and mammals have been recovered from the strata that make up the Malargüe Group.

Mammals of the Agua de la Piedra Formation
Archaeohyrax suniensis, Argyrohyrax proavus, Asmodeus petrasnerus, Fieratherium sorex, Gualta cuyana, Hegetotheriopsis sulcatus, Mendozahippus fierensis, Meteutatus aff. lagenaformis, Proborhyaena gigantea, Prohegetotherium malalhuense, P. schiaffinoi, P. cf. sculptum, Propachyrucos cf. smithwoodwardi, ?Prozaedyus aff. impressus, Pyrotherium romeroi, Stenotatus aff. ornatus, Trachytherus cf. spegazzinianus, cf. Archaeotypotherium sp., Pharsophorus sp., Proadinotherium sp., Progaleopithecus sp., cf. Prosotherium sp., Acaremyidae indet., Glyptodontidae indet., Interatheriidae indet., Litopterna indet., ?Megalonychidae indet., Notohippidae indet., Toxodontidae indet.

See also 

 List of fossil sites
 Santa Lucía Formation, Maastrichtian to Danian (Tiupampan) fossiliferous formation of the Potosí Basin, Bolivia
 Yacoraite Formation, Maastrichtian to Danian fossiliferous formation of the Salta Basin
 Lopez de Bertodano Formation, Maastrichtian to Danian fossiliferous formation of northern Antarctica

References

Bibliography 
Cretaceous
 
 
 
 
 

Paleogene
 
 
 
 
 

 
Geologic formations of Argentina
Upper Cretaceous Series of South America
Paleocene Series of South America
Oligocene Series of South America
Sandstone formations
Mudstone formations
Conglomerate formations
Limestone formations
Tuff formations
Fluvial deposits
Deltaic deposits
Lacustrine deposits
Aeolian deposits
Shallow marine deposits
Geology of La Pampa Province
Geology of Mendoza Province
Geology of Neuquén Province
Geology of Río Negro Province